The 1997–98 Sussex County Football League season was the 73rd in the history of Sussex County Football League a football competition in England.

Division One

Division One featured 17 clubs which competed in the division last season, along with three new clubs, promoted from Division Two:
Chichester City
Littlehampton Town
Redhill

League table

Division Two

Division Two featured 13 clubs which competed in the division last season, along with five new clubs.
Clubs relegated from Division One:
Oakwood
Southwick
Three Bridges
Clubs promoted from Division Three:
Shinewater Association
Sidlesham

Also, East Grinstead changed name to East Grinstead Town.

League table

Division Three

Division Three featured twelve clubs which competed in the division last season, along with four new clubs:
Bosham, relegated from Division Two
Oving Social Club
Steyning Town, relegated from Division Two
Westfield, joined from the East Sussex League

Also, Sun Alliance changed name to Royal Sun Alliance.

League table

References

1997-98
1997–98 in English football leagues